Karchambu may refer to:
 Karchambu-e Jonubi Rural District
 Karchambu-e Shomali Rural District